KMMA may refer to:
 KMMA (FM), a radio station (97.1 FM) in Green Valley, Arizona, United States
 KMMA-CD, a defunct television station (channel 41) in San Luis Obispo, California, United States
 KOND, a radio station (107.5 FM) in Hanford, California, which held the KMMA call sign from April to October 1991